Cypress Mountain is a ski area in West Vancouver, British Columbia, Canada, located in the southern section of Cypress Provincial Park, operated under a BC Parks Park Use Permit.

The ski resort is a 30-minute drive north of downtown Vancouver, and has 53 named alpine ski runs (many accessible for night skiing) and 19 km of cross country trails. Snowshoeing tours are also popular. Snow schools and rentals, Cypress Creek Grill, Gold Medal Cafe and Crazy Raven Bar and Grill and a Big Bear Sports retail shop are also located on the premises in the Cypress Creek Lodge.

Cypress Mountain hosted the Freestyle Skiing and Snowboarding events of the 2010 Winter Olympics, including SkiCross as a demonstration sport, and the first running of Snowboardcross as a Medal sport.

The resort is legally known as Cypress Bowl Recreational Limited Partnership, previously owned by Boyne Resorts, then sold to CNL Income Properties, then Och-Ziff Capital Management, but Boyne Canada has continued to run the ski operation for several years under a lease-back agreement. Boyne repurchased the resort in March 2018.

The ski resort name Cypress Mountain is derived from the name of the bowl between the three mountains, Mount Strachan, Black Mountain, and Hollyburn Mountain – "Cypress Bowl", which was the original and still-used common name of the resort (the facilities by Cypress Bowl Recreations Ltd.). The term cypress comes from the yellow cedar tree Cupressus nootkatensis which is common in the park at altitudes over 800 metres, and is also known as yellow cypress, as well as from the name of the park in which the ski operation is located.

Despite the resort name, there is in fact no mountain named Cypress Mountain in the park.

History
The ski area was initially opened by BC Parks in the 1970s, after two Murray-Latta double-chairs were constructed on Mt. Strachan and Black Mountain. Night skiing was initially added in 1985 on those two chairs. In 1987, the Sky Chair was installed at the peak of Mt. Strachan, opening up new terrain and reaching the highest point on either mountain. The chair was a Mueller double relocated from Apex Mountain Resort.

Cypress was the first ski resort in BC to allow snowboarding, doing so on March 15, 1987.

Another double-chair, the Midway Chair, was installed in 1990 on the lower slopes of Mt. Strachan. In 1997, the original double chair on Mt. Strachan was replaced with a Poma fixed-grip quad following the same lift line. After Cypress was purchased by Boyne Resorts in 2001, the original chairlift on Black Mountain was replaced by the Eagle Express, a detachable quad chair built by Doppelmayr. Additionally, the rope tow in the beginners area was replaced with a fixed-grip quad chair.

In 2007, the Sunrise quad chair was replaced with the Lions Express Quad Chair. This reduced the ride time up Mt. Strachan by nearly half. The previous Sunrise chair was moved across to Black Mountain and was installed on new terrain, which opened 9 new ski trails. This chair is now called the Raven Ridge Quad Chair.

In 2022 Cypress closed Sky Chair and is building a new "SkyQuad", A fixed-grip quad lift. The lift opened December 18, 2022 according to social media posts. after delays due to a construction helicopter needing to conduct an emergency drop of a construction load due to unexpected sudden weather.  No persons were injured during the mishap.

Climate 
Cypress Mountain has a subpolar oceanic climate (Köppen Cfc) using the -3 ˚C isotherm. Summer days are mild with cool nights, while winters are long, moderately cold, and contain extreme amounts of precipitation.

Amenities (Alpine skiing) 
Cypress Mountain Resort has six chair lifts which include two high-speed detachable quad chairlifts (Eagle Express and the Lions Express), two fixed-grip quad chairs (Raven Ridge and Easy Rider) and two double chairlifts (Sky Chair and Midway.) There is also a magic carpet and magic go round in the kids camp area and a tube park tow.

Runs
There are 53 runs including 5 green runs, 23 blue runs, 21 black runs, and 12 double black runs which 8 of them being glades. The longest run is a combination of runs, the T-33-Collins combination, which measures 4.1 km and the shortest run is the run Rideout, which measures about 10 meters. Below is a list of runs.

Amenities (Nordic skiing) 
Cypress Mountain Resort is home to the only Nordic (cross country) ski trails in the Lower Mainland region of British Columbia, and is located on 30 minutes from the downtown core via car. The Nordic trails at Hollyburn Ridge provide a mix of terrain over 19 kilometers of groomed and track set trails with 7.5 kilometers of trails being lit for night skiing.  Hollyburn Lodge (constructed in 1926, renovated in 2016) has a long and rich history supporting early backcountry ski enthusiasts, Nordic skiers, and snowshoers.  Nordic operations elevation: 886 metres.

2010 Winter Olympics 
During the Vancouver 2010 Olympic Winter Games, Cypress hosted all of the freestyle skiing and snowboarding competitions (moguls, aerials, ski cross, half-pipe, snowboard cross and parallel giant slalom). The half-pipe and the venues for the moguls and aerials were completed in the summer of 2007. Just before the games and due to unseasonably mild conditions, the ski resort was almost free of snow, where the snow had to be airlifted by helicopters and transported by trucks from higher elevations.

See also 
 List of ski areas and resorts in Canada
 Cypress Provincial Park
 Mount Seymour
 Mount Seymour Provincial Park
 Grouse Mountain
 The Lions

References

External links 

 Cypress Mountain

Venues of the 2010 Winter Olympics
Olympic freestyle skiing venues
Olympic snowboarding venues
Geography of British Columbia
Ski areas and resorts in British Columbia
Tourism in British Columbia
West Vancouver
Pacific Ranges